Iris douglasiana, the Douglas iris, is a common wildflower of the coastal regions of Northern and Central California and southern Oregon in the United States. It is most common in grasslands near the coast; it is regarded as a noxious weed in pastures, because it forms clumps that inhibit other vegetation, and its leaves are bitter and unpalatable to cattle.

This is a typical beardless iris of subgenus Limniris, series Californicae, growing from a rhizome that is typically less than a centimeter in diameter. The flowers, appearing from April to June, are usually a purplish-blue, though occasionally white or yellow flowers are found.

Taxonomy
It was first described by 19th century botanist David Douglas in Monterey, California.

It was first published by the british botanist William Herbert in 'Bot. Beechey Voy.' 9 on page 395 in 1840.

Several varieties have been recognized, for example Iris douglasiana var. altissima  and Iris douglasiana var. oregonensis , but the species is highly variable and the varieties may not be well enough defined to be of much practical use. The Douglas iris hybridizes freely with several other species; its natural hybrid with I. innominata has been designated as Iris ×thompsonii , and the garden hybrid with the same species as Iris ×aureonympha .

This plant has gained the Royal Horticultural Society's Award of Garden Merit.

References

External links

Entry in the Flora of North America Online
Treatment from the Jepson Manual
Photographs from the CalPhotos archive
West Coast Native Iris information

douglasiana
Flora of California
Flora of Oregon
Flora of the Klamath Mountains
Garden plants of North America
Plants described in 1840